Brunn-Maria Enzersdorf is a railway station serving the town of Brunn am Gebirge in Lower Austria.

References 

Railway stations in Lower Austria
Austrian Federal Railways